Piece of Cake or A Piece of Cake may refer to:

Literature
Piece of Cake (novel), a 1983 novel by Derek Robinson
"A Piece of Cake", a 1942 short story by Roald Dahl
A Piece of Cake: A Memoir, an autobiography by Cupcake Brown

Music
A Piece of Cake (EP), a 1996 EP by Cake
Piece of Cake (album), the 3rd album by Seattle band Mudhoney
Piece of Cake, an album by the band Vengeance
"Piece of Cake", a song by Jethro Tull from their album Nightcap

Other uses
A Piece of Cake (film), a 1948 British comedy fantasy film
Piece of Cake (manga), a manga and film
"Piece of Cake" (Rugrats episode), seventh series episode of the American animated series Rugrats
Piece of Cake (TV series), a British mini series based on the novel

See also
Slam dunk (disambiguation)